This is a list of listed buildings in the former burgh of Clydebank in West Dunbartonshire, Scotland. Although burghs were abolished for administrative purposes in 1975, Historic Scotland continue to use them and civil parishes for the purposes of geographically categorising listed buildings.

List 

|}

Key

Notes

References
 All entries, addresses and coordinates are based on data from Historic Scotland. This data falls under the Open Government Licence

Clydebank
Clydebank